Devrampur is a village in Farrukhabad, Uttar Pradesh, India.

References

Villages in Jaunpur district